The Tower Hill Memorial in London is a pair of Commonwealth War Graves Commission memorials commemorating 36,087 civilian merchant seamen who were lost at sea in the First and Second World Wars.

During the First World War, 3,305 merchant ships were sunk with a total of around 17,000 crew and personnel lost. In the Second World War, 4,786 merchant ships were sunk with a total of around 32,000 crew and personnel lost. Not all these ship losses are named on this memorial, as some ships were sunk or captured with no casualties. Similarly, some of those named on the memorial died in incidents or battles where the ship was not lost.

The dead are listed by the ships they served on. Although many of the ships listed on the memorial were sunk, the loss of the ship is not necessary for it to be listed—the memorial commemorates members of the British Merchant Navy who died as a result of enemy action and who have no known grave.  Those with known graves are not commemorated here, nor are the missing that served in other organisations (such as the gunners manning defensively equipped merchant ships), or those listed on other memorials to missing merchant seafarers (such as the memorials to the missing of the Indian Merchant Navy). Crew members lost when hospital ships were targeted are included here (see list of hospital ships sunk in World War I and list of hospital ships sunk in World War II). As well as cargo ships, a number of ocean liners were chartered or requisitioned and used to transport troops and cargo during the war.

Similarly, the listings for SS Inanda and  refer to the same ship, repaired, renamed and later sunk.

There are 24 sections of name panels on the First World War memorial and 132 name panels on the Second World War memorial, with the ships of the mercantile marine (later merchant navy) and fishing fleets listed separately.

First World War
Over 1400 ships are named on the memorial; this list links to those ships that have articles.

HMT Boorara (see )
 

 

 

HMHS Huntley (see )

SS Southland (see )

Second World War
Over 2100 ships are named on the memorial; this list links to those ships that have articles.

Those listed on the Second World War memorial include Donald Clarke who served on SS San Emiliano and was posthumously awarded both the George Cross and the Lloyd's War Medal for Bravery at Sea.

The entries marked with an asterisk (*) appear on the memorial on the final panels, which have been used to add additional names over the years since the initial unveiling. SS Empire Blanda is an example of a ship that appears twice on the memorial, once for its initial listing and once for additional names.

SS Archangel (see )

SS Box Hill (see )

 (also listed as SS Empire Attendant)

SS Empire Ability (see )

SS Empire Airman (see )

SS Empire Attendant (see )
SS Empire Avocet (see )

 (*)

SS Empire Citizen (see )

SS Empire Corporal (see )

SS Empire Forest (see )
SS Empire Guillemot (see )

SS Empire Leopard (see )

SS Empire Springbuck (see )

SS Wildebeeste (see )

 (*)

SS Hektoria (see )
SS Hobbema (see )

SS Inanda (see )

 (*)

SS Mill Hill (see )

 (*)

 (*)

SS Tamaroa (see )

SS Vojvoda Putnik (see )

SS Western Chief (see )
SS Wilhelmina (see )

See also
U-boat Campaign (World War I)
British merchant seamen of World War II

References

External links
 
 Tower Hill: 'Lest we forget' (includes an index of all the ships named on the memorial)

British military memorials and cemeteries
Lists of ships